Siha is one of the seven administrative districts of Kilimanjaro Region in Tanzania. It is bordered to the west by Meru District in Arusha Region and to the northeast by Rombo District and the southeast Hai District. The western part of Mount Kilimanjaro is located within the district's boundaries.

According to the 2012 Tanzania National Census, the population of Siha District was 116,313.

Administrative subdivisions
As of 2012, Siha District was administratively divided into 12 wards.

Wards

 Biriri
 Gararagua
 Naeny
 Karansi
 Kashashi
 Livishi
 Makiwaru
 Nasai
 Ndumeti
 Ngarenairobi
 Olkolili
 Sanya Juu

References

Districts of Kilimanjaro Region